Witica may refer to:
 an alternative spelling of Wittiza (c. 687 – probably 710), a Visigothic King of Hispania
 Witica (spider), a spider genus in the family Araneidae